The Lake Haiyaha Trail is a historic hiking trail in Rocky Mountain National Park near Estes Park, Colorado.  The trail is also known as, or subsumes, Nymph Lake Trail and Dream Lake Trail.  It goes from Bear Lake up past Nymph Lake, then past Dream Lake, up to Lake Haiyaha.

The trail was built between 1930 and 1935 by landscape architect Allison van V. Dunn of the National Park Service.  It was listed on the National Register of Historic Places (NRHP) in 2008.  The NRHP listing included  with one contributing structure.

References

National Register of Historic Places in Rocky Mountain National Park
Park buildings and structures on the National Register of Historic Places in Colorado
Buildings and structures completed in 1930
Transportation in Larimer County, Colorado
National Register of Historic Places in Larimer County, Colorado
1930s establishments in Colorado